The Orchard is a tea room and tea garden in Grantchester, near Cambridge, serving morning coffee, lunches and afternoon teas. Since opening in 1897, it has been a popular retreat for Cambridge students, teachers and tourists, as well as locals, with many famous names among its patrons. The Orchard is open every day of the year (with the exception of some days around Christmas) from 9:30 to 17:00, and can be reached both by road and punt.

History
The history of The Orchard started in 1897 (the orchard itself was first planted in 1868) when a group of Cambridge students asked the landlady, Mrs Stevenson of Orchard House, if they could take their tea in the orchard rather than on the front lawn as the custom was. This practice soon became the norm, and the place grew in popularity. The next phase in the history of The Orchard began when the poet Rupert Brooke took up lodging in the house in 1909. A graduate student of great popularity in the university community at the time, Brooke soon attracted a great following at the place, among them Virginia Woolf, John Maynard Keynes, E.M. Forster, Bertrand Russell, Augustus John, and Ludwig Wittgenstein – the so-called Grantchester Group, or the neo-pagans as Woolf called them. Brooke later lodged in a neighbouring house, the Old Vicarage and immortalised both houses in his poem The Old Vicarage, Grantchester. Written while Brooke was in Berlin in 1912, the poem ends with the lines:

Subsequently, the ownership of Orchard House and the tea room passed to Robin Callan, originator of the Callan Method for the study of English by non-native speakers.

External links
Home page
Brooke's The Old Vicarage, Grantchester on Wikisource

Tea houses of the United Kingdom
Gardens in Cambridgeshire
Restaurants established in 1897
Grantchester